Homonopsis is a genus of moths belonging to the subfamily Tortricinae of the family Tortricidae.

Species
Homonopsis foederatana (Kennel, 1901)
Homonopsis illotana (Kennel, 1901)
Homonopsis multilata Wang Li & Wang, 2003
Homonopsis rubens Kuznetsov, 1976

See also
List of Tortricidae genera

References

 , 1964, Ent. Obozr. 43: 873. 
 , 2005, World Catalogue of Insects 5.
 , 2003: A study on the genus Homonopsis from China (Lepidoptera: Tortricidae: Tortricinae). Acta Zoologica Cracoviensia 46 (4): 339-345. Full article:

External links
tortricidae.com

Archipini
Tortricidae genera